I'm Drunk, I Love You is a 2017 Filipino romantic comedy independent film directed by JP Habac, and written by Habac and Giancarlo Abrahan. It stars Maja Salvador and Paulo Avelino, who previously worked together in the 2015 television soap opera Bridges of Love; the film serves as their second project together. The film tells the story of two best friends, Carson (Salvador) and Dio (Avelino), and the former’s seven-year-long unrequited love for the latter.

The film, whose title is commonly abbreviated as "IDILY", was released in the Philippines on February 15, 2017.

Synopsis
Days before graduation, two college best friends go on one last road trip where they settle how they really feel for each other.

Cast
 Maja Salvador as Caridad Sonia "Carson" Herrera
 Paulo Avelino as Dionysus "Dio" Brillo
 Dominic Roco as Jason Ty
 Jasmine Curtis-Smith as Pathy
 Irma Adlawan as Carson's mother
 Jim Paredes as Dio's father

Production

Development
Director JP Habac conceived the idea for the film by citing his nightly drinking sessions he had had with his friends. He stated in Filipino: "Alam mo na yan, inuman tapos may kaibigan kang masyadong nalasing, tapos sinigaw niya yung mga salitang yan (You know what it is, drinking and there is that friend who gets intoxicated, and then he shouts those words)." Additionally, he stated: "Gusto ko talaga magpakita ng sine na totoo at yung mapapaisip ka. Marami na tayong mga cute na pelikula. I wanted to make a film that would challenge and break RomCom norms. (I truly wanted to show true cinema and one that makes you think thoroughly. We have gotten many cute films. I wanted to make a film that would challenge and break RomCom norms.)"

After two years of conceptualizing these ideas, Habac tapped Giancarlo Abrahan to write the script together.

Casting
Habac said that during the casting call for the character of Jason, he noted that actors auditioning for the role should come across as someone similar to George, one of the lead characters played by English actor Rupert Everett in the 1997 romantic comedy film My Best Friend's Wedding. The role later went to Dominic Roco.

Themes
I'm Drunk, I Love You is described as a film about unrequited love, using the consumption of alcohol as plot device.

Soundtrack
Having been a fan of musical films (such as Once and Begin Again) and musicals in general, director JP Habac was inspired to include a soundtrack for the film, featuring OPM tracks. In the film, lead stars Maja Salvador and Paulo Avelino performed covers of OPM songs, such as a duet for songs "Maniwala Ka Sana" by Parokya ni Edgar and "Hanggang Dito Na Lang" by Jimmy Bondoc. The soundtrack also features OPM songs by various artists.

Release
I'm Drunk, I Love You was released in the Philippines on February 15, 2017, by Solar Entertainment Corporation.

On February 13, the film's star and co-producer Paulo Avelino express dismayed due to the film's limited release, in 60 theaters across the country. He complained on a Twitter post by saying "Just 60 cinemas for I’m Drunk I Love You? I strongly believe this film is worth more." On a separate tweet the same day, he complained before the MTRCB (particularly its board member Mocha Uson) posing this question in Filipino, "Bakit nga ba hindi inuuna ng mga lokal na sinehan ang mga Pelikupang [sic] Pilipino kesa sa Dayuhang Pelikula? Gawin sanang Batas (Why don't local cinemas prioritize Filipino Films than Foreign Films? Hopefully, it would become a law.)" The film's production companies TBA (Tuko, Buchi Boy and Artikulo Uno), announced on February 15 that the number of theaters had been narrowed down to 33 theaters, at which time the film would be theatrically released.

On February 22, Avelino directed criticisms toward local cinemas and the Film Development Council of the Philippines helmed by chairperson Liza Diño, at which time the film will be pulled out from cinemas. One of his tweets to Diño read:

Diño responded to Avelino hours later, saying in part that "Fdcp is working with stakeholders." Maja Salvador would later join Avelino in defending the film from being pulled out from theaters. Netizens who are supportive of the film also promoted the hashtag "#SaveIDILY".

Critical reception
The film was met with positive reactions from critics. Oggs Cruz of Rappler described the film as "more than just a love story", and said: "[T]he film is an ode to intoxication, whether with alcohol or silly emotions. It celebrates the pleasures of the present, while poking fun at the idiocies of the past and worrying about the future." Mari-an Santos of Philippine Entertainment Portal praised Salvador and Avelino's chemistry onscreen, and said: "The movie is a trip. A beautiful, colorful one that, if you are willing to strap yourself up for the ride, you will enjoy anyway." Blogger Louie Baharom of Live Love Cinema gave 4/5, and described it as "[A]n emotionally sincere wake-up call to the millennials and everybody else who get blinded by affections; a cheery celebration of one’s own youth and the idea of it being something that just bursts like a bubble – all kept at a steady pace that pinches the heart, ignites the soul, and gets us to appreciate and savor every passing second as in life." Philbert Dy of The Neighborhood said, "[The film]  exudes a yearning for the carefree days of being young and drunk and in love, all the while acknowledging how that could never last."

Sequel
On October 17, 2018, Director JB Habac confirmed that a sequel is in the works and that he was still in the process of finishing the script.

Awards and recognitions

References

External links
 

2017 films
2017 romantic comedy films
Philippine independent films
Philippine romantic comedy films
2010s Tagalog-language films
Philippine New Wave
2017 independent films
2010s English-language films